This is a list of airlines currently operating in French Polynesia.

See also
 List of defunct airlines of French Polynesia
 List of airlines

Airlines
Airlines
French Polynesia
Polynesia
French Polynesia